Garkan may refer to:

Garkan-e Olya, Lorestan Province
Garkan-e Sofla, Lorestan Province
Garkan-e Jonubi District, in Isfahan Province
Garkan Rural District, in Isfahan Province
Garkan-e Shomali Rural District, in Isfahan Province